The Honda CD175 is a  motorcycle made from 1967 to 1979 by the Honda Motor Company. Described by Honda as a "great new all-rounder, at home around town or putting the highway behind you", it was the touring model in Honda's 175 cc motorcycle lineup that also included the sportier CB175 and the off-road CL175 version. The CD175 shared some components and design elements in common with other models from Honda including the early-model pressed steel backbone frame, sometimes known as "T bone".

It had an electric starter, except in the UK, turn signals, deeply valanced mudguards and mirrors. The inclined air-cooled engine used on earlier models was an evolutionary version of the older Honda CB160 power plant and contained some of the same components including most of the castings and some internal items.

Models
1967 models (product code 237) began at serial number CD175-1000001.  Also known as the CA175, CD175A, or CD175 K0 just over 17000 of these units were built and distributed worldwide although only to commonwealth countries.  Styling and appearance on these early CD models was similar to the larger CB450K0 "Black Bomber", especially the British version which received a set of low-rise handlebars (as well as no electric start and different turn signal positions).

1968 models (also product code 237) began at serial number CD175-10017136 and incorporated changes that allowed for export to the USA.  These changes included a different fuel tank with larger, less pointy chrome covers and knee pads, larger more bulbous battery and tool covers, upgraded lighting and signals/switches, and a hybrid welded-tube/stamped frame.  The engine remained unchanged from 1967.

1969 "K3" models (product code 302) introduced the vertical engine and all-tube frame and some smaller body work changes that continued until the end of production in 1979.

Specifications

The CD175 had a 360° crankshaft, wasted spark ignition, single carburetor, a parallel twin high revving engine, 16" wheels and a  speedometer. Each connecting rod big end had roller bearings. In 1979 it was replaced by Honda CD185.

From 1967 to 1968: the machine had a 4 stroke 360 degree parallel twin; air cooled; single overhead cam (chain driven); cylinders inclined 30 degrees forward from vertical ("sloper" engine) with 9:1 compression ratio; max 17 bhp @ 10,500 rpm. From 1969 to 1979 it had a similar 4 stroke engine but with vertical cylinders ("vertical" engine); max 15 bhp @ 10,000 rpm. Both engines used a single Carburetor. Electrics were 6 volt (battery ignition).

References

CD175
Motorcycles introduced in 1967
Standard motorcycles
Motorcycles powered by straight-twin engines